Gintarė is a Lithuanian feminine name. It is the feminine form of Gintaras. It may refer to:

Gintarė Adomaitytė (born 1957), Lithuanian journalist
Gintarė Bražaitė (born 1992), Lithuanian weightlifter and coach
Gintarė Gaivenytė (born 1986), Lithuanian racing cyclist
Gintarė Jautakaitė (born 1958), Lithuanian singer
Gintarė Petronytė (born 1989), Lithuanian basketball player
Gintarė Scheidt (born 1982), Lithuanian dinghy sailor 
Gintarė Skaistė (born 1981),  Lithuanian politician
Gintarė Venčkauskaitė (born 1992), Lithuanian modern pentathlete
Gintarė Vostrecovaitė (born 1986), Lithuanian figure skater

Lithuanian feminine given names